Orbis Investment Management is an investment management firm headquartered in Bermuda, with offices in London, Vancouver, Sydney, San Francisco, Hong Kong, Tokyo and Luxembourg. The company has a close relationship with Allan Gray Investment Management in South Africa and Allan Gray Australia. Orbis manages approximately $35 billion on behalf of both institutional and individual investors. Orbis Access, its direct-to-consumer platform, was launched in the UK in January 2015.

References

Financial services companies established in 1989
Investment management companies of Bermuda